Waconia Township is a rural township in Carver County, Minnesota, United States. The population was 1,284 as of the 2000 census.

History
Waconia Township was organized in 1858, and named after Lake Waconia.

Geography
According to the United States Census Bureau, the township has a total area of 32.5 square miles (84.2 km), of which 27.1 square miles (70.2 km) is land and 5.4 square miles (14.0 km) (16.58%) is water.

The southeast quarter of the city of Mayer and the entire city of Waconia are located within the township geographically but are separate entities.

Township 116 North, Range 25 West, Fifth Principal Meridian of the Public Land Survey System.

Lakes
 Burandt Lake (west three-quarters)
 Donders Lake
 Goose Lake (south three-quarters)
 Hydes Lake
 Lake Patterson
 Lake Waconia (west three-quarters)
 Rice Lake (northeast edge)
 Rutz Lake
 Swan Lake

Adjacent townships
 Watertown Township (north)
 Laketown Township (east)
 Dahlgren Township (southeast)
 Benton Township (south)
 Young America Township (southwest)
 Camden Township (west)

Unincorporated community
 Maple

Cemeteries
The township contains three cemeteries: Rutz Lake, Saint Josephs and Waconia Public.

Major highways
  Minnesota State Highway 5
  Minnesota State Highway 25

Demographics

As of the census of 2000, there were 1,284 people, 429 households, and 349 families residing in the township. There were 443 housing units at an average density of 16.3/sq mi (6.3/km). The racial makeup of the township was 99.14% White, 0.08% Native American, 0.23% Asian, 0.08% from other races, and 0.47% from two or more races. Hispanic or Latino of any race were 0.16% of the population.

There were 429 households of out of which 38.7% had children under the age of 18 living with them, 74.4% were married couples living together, 3.7% had a female householder with no husband present, and 18.6% were non-families. 12.8% of all households were made up of individuals, and 3.7% had someone living alone who was 65 years of age or older.  The average household size was 2.99 and the average family size was 3.30.

In the township the population was spread out, with 30.7% under the age of 18, 6.5% from 18 to 24, 29.8% from 25 to 44, 23.9% from 45 to 64, and 9.0% who were 65 years of age or older.  The median age was 38 years. For every 100 females, there were 103.5 males.  For every 100 females age 18 and over, there were 106.0 males.

The median income for a household in the township was $76,113, and the median income for a family was $76,782. Males had a median income of $46,563 versus $35,132 for females. The per capita income for the township was $27,437.  About 2.1% of families and 2.9% of the population were below the poverty line, including 1.9% of those under age 18 and 10.7% of those age 65 or over.

Politics

References
 United States National Atlas
 United States Census Bureau 2007 TIGER/Line Shapefiles
 United States Board on Geographic Names (GNIS)

Townships in Carver County, Minnesota
Townships in Minnesota
Populated places established in 1858
1858 establishments in Minnesota